Will Znidaric, ACE, is an American film and television editor and producer. He is best known for his work on Neymar: The Perfect Chaos, Biggie: I Got a Story to Tell and Five Came Back.

Career
Znidaric graduated with a BA in  film production at the USC School of Cinema-Television in 1996. He is a member of American Cinema Editors (ACE).

Filmography

Awards and nominations

References

External links
 
 

Living people
American television editors
American film editors
USC School of Cinematic Arts alumni
Year of birth missing (living people)